Szentkirályszabadja is a village in Veszprém county, Hungary. For many years it was the home of the 87th Bakony Combat Helicopter Regiment of the 5th Army, Hungarian People's Army.

References

External links 

 Street map (Hungarian)
 Szentkirályszabadja from a bird's eyeview

Populated places in Veszprém County